Ifeoma Chukwufumnay Onumonu (born 25 February 1994) is an American-born Nigerian professional footballer who plays for NJ/NY Gotham FC in the National Women's Soccer League (NWSL) and for the Nigeria women's national team. She previously played for Reign FC, Portland Thorns FC, and Boston Breakers. She played collegiate soccer at the University of California Berkeley and in high school at Los Osos High School.

Born in the United States, Onumonu has represented Nigeria since 2021.

Club career

Boston Breakers
After playing collegiately at the University of California, Onumonu was drafted by the Boston Breakers with the 8th overall pick in the 2017 NWSL College Draft. She appeared in 18 games for Boston in her rookie season.

Portland Thorns
After the Boston Breakers folded ahead of the 2018 season, Onumonu was selected by the Portland Thorns in the 2018 Dispersal Draft. She was waived on May 8, 2019, after playing in eight games.

Reign FC
On 14 May 2019, Onumonu signed with Reign FC as a National Team Replacement player. After stellar performances, she earned a supplemental roster spot on June 28.

NJ/NY Gotham FC
On 17 January 2020, Onumonu was traded to Sky Blue FC. She re-signed with the team on a one-year deal on January 20, 2022 based on her strong performance during the 2021 NWSL season, which saw her named to the Best XI Second Team.

On October 25, 2022, Onumonu signed a new three-year contract that will keep her with Gotham FC through the 2025 season.

International career
Onumonu has represented the United States on the Under-23 Women's National Team. In June 2021 she received her first call up to the Nigeria Women's National Team

Awards and honors 
Individual
NWSL Best XI Second Team: 2021
 NWSL Team of the Month:  June 2019, August 2021
 NWSL Player of the Week: 2019 week 10, 2021 week 13

References

External links
 U.S. Soccer player profile
 Cal Golden Bears player profile
 NJ/NY Gotham FC player profile

1994 births
Living people
Citizens of Nigeria through descent
Nigerian women's footballers
Women's association football forwards
Nigeria women's international footballers
Igbo sportspeople
People from Rancho Cucamonga, California
Sportspeople from San Bernardino County, California
Soccer players from California
American women's soccer players
California Golden Bears women's soccer players
Boston Breakers draft picks
Boston Breakers players
Portland Thorns FC players
OL Reign players
NJ/NY Gotham FC players
National Women's Soccer League players
American sportspeople of Nigerian descent
African-American women's soccer players
21st-century African-American sportspeople
21st-century African-American women